Tosapusia sauternesensis is a species of sea snail, a marine gastropod mollusk, in the family Costellariidae, the ribbed miters.

Description
The length of the shell attains 43.7 mm.

Holotype and type locality 
The holotype of the species (MNHN IM-2000-30178), measured 42.2 mm. 

Type Locality : Philippines, Hilutangan Channel between Mactan and Olango Island Group, 160 m.

References

External links
 Guillot de Suduiraut, E. (1997). Description d'une nouvelle espèce de Costellariidae des Philippines. Apex. 12(4): 117-119

Costellariidae
Gastropods described in 1997